Material monism is a Pre-Socratic belief which provides an explanation of the physical world by saying that all of the world's objects are composed of a single element. 

Among the material monists were the three Milesian philosophers: Thales, who believed that everything was composed of water; Anaximander, who believed it was apeiron; and Anaximenes, who believed it was air. Although their theories were primitive, these philosophers were the first to give an explanation of the physical world without referencing the supernatural; this opened the way for much of modern science (and philosophy), which has the same goal of explaining the world without dependence on the supernatural.

See also 
 Arche
 Dialectical monism
 Dialectical materialism

Notes 

Theories in ancient Greek philosophy
Materialism
Monism
Metaphysical theories